Magzhan Zhumabaev is a district of North Kazakhstan Region in northern Kazakhstan. The administrative center of the district is the town of Bulayevo. Population:

Name
It was giving named after a Kazakh writer and poet, Magzhan Zhumabayev.

References

Districts of Kazakhstan
North Kazakhstan Region